Brawl Stars is a multiplayer online battle arena and third-person hero shooter video game developed and published by the Finnish video game company Supercell. It was released worldwide on December 12, 2018, on iOS and Android. The game features various game modes, each with a different objective. Players can choose from a selection of Brawlers, which are characters that can be controlled with on-screen joysticks in a game match.

Gameplay 

In Brawl Stars, players battle against other players or AI opponents in multiple game modes. Players can choose between characters called Brawlers that they have unlocked through Boxes, the Brawl Pass, the Trophy Road, or purchased through the Shop to use in battles. In December 2022, Boxes were removed, and all previous methods to get them were replaced with credits and chroma credits, which are used to unlock Brawlers, who are now mostly placed on the "Starr Road".

Brawl Stars has a variety of different game modes that players can choose from, each one having a different objective. Players can invite friends to play with them up to the maximum team size of the game mode.

In addition, it is possible to purchase skins with Gems, Star Points, and Coins, or unlock them through the Brawl Pass, which will alter the appearance, animations, effects, and/or sounds of Brawlers.

Brawl Pass 
In May 2020, a game update added a new reward system called “Brawl Pass”. The Brawl Pass is the game's version of a battle pass. When players compete in battles, they earn Tokens to progress along the Brawl Pass, which the tokens required would exponentially increase per Brawl Pass level. Players can earn credits, chroma credits, Gems, skins, Pins (emojis that can be used during battles or in a team game room), Coins, Power Points, and Brawlers from the pass. There are two types of Brawl Pass. All players have the free Brawl Pass by default. Players can purchase the premium Brawl Pass with Gems.

Power League 
Power League is a competitive ranking system added to the game in season 5. This replaced the Power Play system. Players unlock this system at 4500 trophies. There are a total of 19 ranks between bronze one and master. Each season lasts two months. At the end of a Power League season, players gain Star Points based on their rank.

Players can enter Power League solo or with teams of three. The winner is decided on a best-of-three format and ties do not count. Each match starts the game randomly choosing a game mode and map. All players from both teams choose a Brawler to ban. All six players in the match must play with a different Brawler. Players in the team can switch Brawlers with each other if they have the specific Brawler unlocked. Progression is varied based on various factors including the opponents ranks.

Club League 
Club League was introduced in season 9 as a new weekly competition between Clubs, where eight Clubs compete during the days Wednesday, Friday and Sunday of the week. Tickets are required to play matches. 4 tickets are given on Wednesday and Friday, with 6 tickets given on Sunday. Clubs compete to gain the most Club Trophies possible by players playing in selected matches. Players who play with other Club members are rewarded by earning more Club Trophies for the club. After each competing day, the Clubs are ranked based on the club's Trophies to earn Club Points.

When the league ends on every Monday, the Clubs are ranked based on the club's Points to determine if the club is promoted or demoted and the number of rewards. Club Ranks are the same as Power League ranks, where progression starts at Bronze I. Each Club member receives Club Coins at the end based on the performance of the club and the member, which can be used in the Club Shop.

Seasons 
Each season brings a new Brawl Pass and Power League. Each season is accompanied with new skins that are themed to the season.

Starr Road 
The Starr Road was introduced at mid season 15, introducing different rewards for the Brawl Pass, and also the removal of Brawl Boxes, which came as Brawl, Big, Mega, and Omega boxes. They would grant rewards such as power points for individual brawlers, used for upgrading them. They would also grant coins, and Brawlers, which were luck-based through their rarities, including Rare, Super Rare, Epic, Mythic, Legendary, and Chromatics, which were individually released for each Brawl Pass season, in addition to the rarity, excepting the current chromatic, which would be inaccessible unless achieving level 30, which you could unlock the Brawler if you possessed the premium Brawl Pass. The Starr Road, in compensation for the removal of boxes, introduced new features, such as credits, chroma credits and fame. Credits were accessible after completing the Brawl Pass at level 70, which allowed you to gain a set amount of credits, coins, and power points per level, which would be set to 500 tokens. They would also be gained though the daily rewards, which would often grant them. By acquiring a number of credits for each Brawler Rarity, (excepting Chromatics) could unlock them. Chroma credits, similar to credits, were obtainable through the Brawl Pass level-up rewards. Using these credits, you could unlock Chromatics, on a separate page of the Starr Road section, which was split into two, the Starr Road and Chromatics. Power points were also modified, to instead of being automatically applied to a random brawler, to being stored in your power points storage, which would cap at 4,000 points.

Development and release 
Supercell set out to develop a team based game similar to League of Legends and Overwatch. The team wanted to create such a game that was designed with mobile devices in mind first. According to Supercell's Frank Keienburg, "Our focus was on retaining a lot of depth while stripping away all the fluff." Although the game contains some elements of the battle royale genre, these were implemented before the genre as a whole took off and the team did not set out to make a game with those elements.

The game is notable for its long soft launch period during which virtually every aspect of the game changed. Supercell officially announced the game via a livestream video on June 14, 2017. It received an iOS soft launch in Canada the following day. The soft launch would last a total of 522 days, during which internally it was doubted whether or not the game would ever actually see a general release. Initially the game was played in portrait mode and had players tapping on the screen, this was changed eventually to players using analog controls and playing in landscape mode. Other changes include changing the UI, changing the metagame and transitioning the game from 2D to 3D. Frank Keienburg attributes the difficult beta period to the developers working in a new genre where they "weren't sure how to interpret its success". The game soft-launched in Finland, Sweden, Denmark, Norway, Ireland, Singapore, Hong Kong, Macao and Malaysia for iOS on January 19, 2018, and on June 26, 2018, Android received early access to the game as a continuation of the soft launch.

Brawl Stars was made globally and officially available on December 12, 2018. It made more than US$63 million in its first month. On June 9, 2020, Brawl Stars was released in Mainland China.

Partnerships 
The game has a partnership with Line Friends to create official merchandise, new skins for Brawlers that are based on Line Friends characters, sticker packs on Line messenger, and new content. A pop-up store was opened in January 2020 in South Korea to sell the merchandise from the partnership. Merchandise is also available at major Line Friends retail stores and online. In September 2022, Brawl Stars also partnered with BT21, featuring new skins and Pins in-game.

The game partnered up with Paris Saint-Germain F.C. (PSG), a French professional soccer club, in 2019 to host Brawl Stars Ball Cup organized by PSG's esports division. There were three online qualifier events and an online playoff event. The top two teams travelled to Paris for the finals. The finals were played live at PSG's home stadium, Parc des Princes. All matches took place in Brawl Ball, a football-like game mode.

The game partnered up with PSG again in 2020 and 2021. During the partnerships, the game launched the Paris Saint-Germain Challenge. The challenges are similar to the championship challenges, but all matches are based in the Brawl Ball game mode. In 2020, the game offered a PSG skin for Shelly for players who won nine matches and lost four or fewer times. PSG's esports division also has a team that competed in the 2020 championship challenge. In 2021, the game offered a PSG Mike skin for Dynamike.

Reception

Awards 
The game was nominated for "Mobile Game" and "EE Mobile Game of the Year" at the 15th British Academy Games Awards.

Critical reception 
Brawl Stars received "mixed or average" reviews or 72 out of 100 on review aggregator Metacritic.

Pocket Gamer'''s Harry Slater scored the game 3 out of 5. Reviewing the game immediately after global release, he praised that game's progression. He criticized Showdown, the game's battle royale mode, for being the weakest of all the game modes that were in the game. He said that Showdown "doesn't capture the real madness of the genre, and there's a distinct lack of tension since you can pretty much see everyone on the map and what they're up to." He mentioned that something felt "missing in Brawl Stars. You'll play, you'll get new characters, you'll unlock new modes, but you're never having quite as much fun as you feel you should be doing." He continued on to say that "the action is relatively flat - in the team matches you know within the first few seconds which way the game is going." He concluded in disappointment because the game did not seem like "the huge step forward for multiplayer mobile action that a lot of us were hoping for."148 Apps' Campbell Bird scored the game 3.5 out of 5. She started with mentioning that the game felt "like a combination of Arena of Valor and Overwatch." She praised the game's graphics and the developer's implementation of the progression system to encourage players to play again, as well as the quick matchmaking. However, she criticized the game's controls for feeling "oddly loose and muddy," the characters falling "into pretty predictable hero shooter archetypes," as well as claiming that "every mode in the game is some variation on something you’ve seen before in other, better multiplayer shooters." She also highlighted that the frequent connection issues and unbalanced teams made the experience of playing the game less enjoyable.

Commercial receptionBrawl Stars has been downloaded over 200 million times. In 2020, Brawl Stars had the second highest gross of any mobile game in Europe. It grossed US$526 million in total in 2020, which accounted for more than half its life time revenue. 
It was also the fourth game by Supercell to surpass US$1 billion in lifetime revenue.

 Brawl Stars Championship 
The Brawl Stars Championship is an open tournament for players across the globe. This tournament consists of the monthly in-game Championship Challenges where players compete in game to win 15 matches in five different game modes and maps without losing 3 matches. After 15 wins, players proceed to the next stage, the regional Monthly Qualifier events, where players must be 16 years or older to participate. Through the qualifier events, players can secure a spot in the regional Monthly Finals. These events would lead to the World Finals.

In 2019, this championship was known as the Brawl Stars World'' Championship. It was held on November 15 to November 16, 2019, at the Busan Exhibition and Convention Center in South Korea. The first-place winner was Nova Esports after a 30 victory. Other participants competing included Animal Chanpuru, Tribe Gaming, 3Bears, Spacestation Gaming, and PSG Esports. With a $250,000 prize pool, it was the first international event for the game and had teams from North America, Europe, Latin America, Southeast Asia, Japan, and South Korea.

In 2020, the World Finals were held between November 21 and 22 with a base $1,000,000 prize pool. Half of the amount was raised through proceeds from an in-game championship package. Eight teams participated in the World Finals, which were originally planned to take place in Katowice, Poland, but was moved online due to the COVID-19 pandemic. PSG Esports was the winner of this year's championship with a prize of $200,000. The other monetary prizes were split between the other teams which won second to eighth place.

In 2021, the Brawl Stars Championship started on February 20. There are eight seasons for the championship that occur once per month starting from February until September. The Championship Challenges and Monthly Qualifiers are each live for two days per season. The top eight teams from the regional Monthly Qualifiers go to the regional Monthly Finals. 16 teams from the Monthly Finals from all seven regions come together to participate in the World Finals, which took place from November 26 to 28 in-person in Bucharest, Romania. The prizes for 2021 are $600,000 in the Monthly Finals, and a minimum of $500,000 in the World Finals with opportunities to increase this amount through in-game offers.

References

External links 
 

2017 video games
Android (operating system) games
Esports games
Free-to-play video games
IOS games
Multiplayer online games
Strategy video games
Supercell (video game company) games
Video games developed in Finland